The 2022 Nepal T20 League, was inaugural edition of the Nepal T20 League, a professional men's domestic Twenty20 cricket competition in Nepal.  The tournament is scheduled to run from 24 December 2022 to 11 January 2023.

Lumbini All Stars became the inaugural champions after defeating Biratnagar Super Kings by 24 runs in the final.

Venues

Squads 
The domestic player draft was held on 10 & 11 September 2022.

League stage 

 The top four teams qualify for the playoffs.
  Advance to Qualifier 1.
  Advance to Eliminator.

Matches

Playoff stage

Preliminary

Qualifier 1

Eliminator

Qualifier 2

Final

Season statistics

Most runs 

Source: ESPNCricinfo

Most wickets 

Source: ESPNCricinfo

Awards

End of the season awards

Controversies

Non-payments 
The match between Kathmandu Knights and Biratnagar Super Kings on 3 January was delayed by two hours after players refused to take the field after failing to get their payments. The players were contracted to get 40%of their payments before the start of the tournament and the remaining 60% during the tournament. Only players from Pokhara Avengers and Lumbini All Stars had been paid 50% of their contracted amount while the rest of the players had not been paid yet. The game resumed after Cricket Association Nepal officials assured the players of their payments.

Spot-fixing 
Kathmandu Knights captain Gyanendra Malla revealed on 4 January that one of his teammates had been approached for match-fixing. The incident was reported to ICC's Anti-Corruption Unit following which a team was sent to Nepal to investigate the claims. The Central investigation Bureau also form specialized teams to look into the incidents. The Bureau in its preliminary investigation revealed that it was keeping close watch on three Nepali players and four foreign players on accusations of spot-fixing. The investigation also found evidence that Seven3Sports, the sports management company organizing the event, were involved in the incidents.

References

External links 

 Series home at ESPNcricinfo

Nepal T20
Nepal T20